Dandakharka  is a village development committee in Dolakha District in the Janakpur Zone of north-eastern Nepal. At the time of the 1991 Nepal census it had a population of 3,827 people living in 760 individual households.

References

External links
UN map of the municipalities of Dolakha District

Populated places in Dolakha District